Ilya Pukhov (born 12 May 1992) is a Belarusian professional football player who is currently playing for Kopyl.

External links
 
 

1992 births
Living people
Belarusian footballers
FC Shakhtyor Soligorsk players
FC Gorodeya players
FC Krumkachy Minsk players
Association football forwards